Curtis Piehau Iaukea III (September 15, 1937 – December 4, 2010) was an American professional wrestler better known as King Curtis Iaukea. Iaukea won championships in several of the major regional U.S. promotions, both as a single and in various tag team combinations, during the 1960s. He then competed in the World Wrestling Federation (WWF) where he won the WWF Tag Team Championship with Baron Scicluna. He was also later The Master of the Dungeon of Doom in World Championship Wrestling (WCW). Under the name "Iau Kea" he appeared in the film The Three Stooges Go Around the World in a Daze with Moe Howard declaring "That's not a man!  That's a committee!".

Early life
He was the great grandson of Colonel Curtis P. Iaukea, a royal chamberlain and diplomat to the court of King Kalākaua and Queen Liliuokalani and son of Honolulu Police Department Inspector Curtis Iaukea II. He attended Punahou School and the University of California Berkeley as an economics major where he lettered as a lineman until he dropped out. He played as a tackle for the BC Lions from 1958-1959 and the Montreal Alouettes in 1959. He was also in camp with the Oakland Raiders in 1960 before being cut.

Professional wrestling career

Wrestling
Iaukea came to Don Owen's Pacific Northwest territory, commonly known as Portland Wrestling in 1961, wrestling under the moniker Prince Kuhio. Teaming with Haru Sasaki, the two would capture the NWA Pacific Northwest Tag Titles on January 19, 1962, holding them for two months. A year later, while traveling between Oregon and the Hawaiian Islands, King Curtis would capture the NWA Pacific Northwest Heavyweight Title on September 5, 1963,
In Australia, King Curtis was a part of the face tag team known as the People's Army with Mark Lewin and Spiros Arion.

His first sojourns to Australia were in the 1964–1965 season, where he was a Heel. He was teamed with Skull Murphy. King Curtis initially wrestled as Curtis Iaukea in his first run in Australia. The King Curtis tag was the one that stuck as he feuded against Mark Lewin. After becoming a fan favorite in the seventies, King Curtis feuded against Tiger Jeet Singh and the Tojo brothers from Japan. King Curtis was also a member of an alliance known as "The People's Army."

Management
After retiring in the mid-1980s, he turned to managing. In ICW, known as King Curtis, he managed Kevin Sullivan and Mark Lewin, taking on the gimmick of a crazed cult leader. His faction feuded with Joe Savoldi and Austin Idol.  In the 80's, he also appeared with Sullivan in Championship Wrestling from Florida as "The Chairman of the Board". 

Curtis Iaukea re-appeared briefly in the WWF promotion as The Wizard, a manager and mouthpiece for Kamala. The Wizard claimed to be in communion with the spirit of the late original Grand Wizard.  He later teamed Kamala with Sika before selling the pair to Mr Fuji. 

He also appeared briefly in WCW as 'The Master' of the Dungeon of Doom stable in the mid-1990s, reuniting with both Kamala and Sullivan (who, as Dungeon leader, would address Iaukea as "my father", and he would address Sullivan as "my son") His role in the Dungeon was to conjure up new Dungeon members for Sullivan's war with  Hulk Hogan.

Championships and accomplishments
50th State Big Time Wrestling
NWA Hawaii Heavyweight Championship (4 times)
NWA United States Heavyweight Championship (Hawaii version) (6 times)
Big Time Wrestling (San Francisco)
NWA United States Heavyweight Championship (San Francisco version) (1 time)
NWA All-Star Pro Wrestling
NWA British Empire/Commonwealth Heavyweight Championship (1 time)
American Wrestling Alliance
AWA United States Heavyweight Championship (1 time)
Championship Wrestling from Florida
NWA Florida Heavyweight Championship (2 times)
NWA Western States Sports
NWA Western States Heavyweight Championship (1 time)
Pacific Northwest Wrestling
NWA Pacific Northwest Heavyweight Championship (1 time)
NWA Pacific Northwest Tag Team Championship (1 time) - with Haru Sasaki
Professional Wrestling Hall of Fame and Museum
Class of 2020
World Championship Wrestling (Australia)
IWA World Heavyweight Championship (4 times)
IWA World Tag Team Championship (3 times) - with Buddy Austin (1) and Mark Lewin (2)
World Brass Knuckles Championship
World Wide Wrestling Federation
WWWF World Tag Team Championship (1 time) with Baron Mikel Scicluna
Wrestling Observer Newsletter
Wrestling Observer Newsletter Hall of Fame (Class of 2011)

References

External links
 

American male professional wrestlers
1937 births
Native Hawaiian people
Sportspeople from Honolulu
2010 deaths
Native Hawaiian professional wrestlers
Professional wrestlers from Hawaii
Professional Wrestling Hall of Fame and Museum
Stampede Wrestling alumni
20th-century professional wrestlers
NWA Florida Heavyweight Champions
NWA Southern Heavyweight Champions (Florida version)
Stampede Wrestling North American Heavyweight Champions
IWA World Heavyweight Champions (Australia)
IWA World Tag Team Champions (Australia)